The Israeli Military Court of Appeals is the supreme military court of the Israel Defense Forces. It considers and judges over appeals submitted by the Military Advocate General which challenge decisions rendered by the District Military Tribunals:

The Central and Air Force District
The General Staff, Sea Corps, and Home Front District
The GOC Army Headquarters and Southern District
The Northern District

Additionally, the Court adjudicates over appeals to the special military tribunals:

The Special Military Tribunal
The Naval Military Tribunal
The Field Tribunals (operated during times of war)

The Court is located in Tel Aviv. , it is presided by Aluf . The president of the court is a member of the General Staff, but is not professionally subordinate to the Chief of Staff.

See also 
Military Advocate General

References

Israel
Military units and formations of Israel
Israeli courts

he:בית הדין הצבאי לערעורים